Georgios Lemonis (born 12 April 1943) is a Greek athlete. He competed in the men's shot put at the 1968 Summer Olympics.

References

1943 births
Living people
Athletes (track and field) at the 1968 Summer Olympics
Greek male shot putters
Olympic athletes of Greece
Place of birth missing (living people)
20th-century Greek people